Ages of Light (1998–2013) is the first best-of compilation by German power metal band Freedom Call. It was released on 26 April 2013 via SPV.

Track listing

Ages of Light (CD 1)

Masqueraded (CD 2)

Credits 
Chris Bay (1998–Present) – Vocals, Guitar, Keyboards – All Tracks
Sascha Gerstner (1998–2001) – Guitar – Ages Of Light (Disc 1): Tracks 1-4
Cédric Dupont (2001–2005) – Guitar – Ages Of Light (Disc 1): Tracks 5-8
Lars Rettkowitz (2005–Present) – Guitar – Ages Of Light (Disc 1): Tracks 9-18 / Masqueraded (Disc 2): All Tracks
Ilker Ersin (1998–2005) – Bass guitar – Ages Of Light (Disc 1): Tracks 1-8
Armin Donderer (2005–2009) – Bass guitar – Ages Of Light (Disc 1): Tracks 9-11
Samy Saemann (2009–2013) – Bass guitar – Ages Of Light (Disc 1): Tracks 12-18 / Masqueraded (Disc 2): All Tracks
Daniel Zimmermann (1998–2010) – Drums – Ages Of Light (Disc 1): Tracks 1-13
Klaus Sperling (2010–2013) – Drums – Ages Of Light (Disc 1): Tracks 14-18 / Masqueraded (Disc 2): All Tracks

References 

Freedom Call albums
2012 compilation albums
SPV/Steamhammer compilation albums